Franciscus Henricus Antheunis, professionally known as Franciscus Henri (born 7 August 1947, The Hague, The Netherlands), is a musician and children's entertainer. He has dual Dutch and Australian nationality. In 1970 he gained national prominence when he competed in the TV talent quest New Faces, which led to a recording contract with the Melbourne-based independent label Fable Records. From 1997, he also performs as Mister Whiskers, a travelling singer who loves children and performs for them with his dog companion, Smiggy.

Biography
Franciscus Henricus Antheunis Jr. was born on 7 August 1947 in The Hague, The Netherlands. In 1956, his father, Franciscus Henricus Antheunis Sr., (born 25 October 1914) and his mother Pietertje (née Van Der Pol, born 21 September 1919) migrated to Australia on board the Dutch ship Johan van Oldenbarnevelt with his older brother Roelof A (born 8 November 1943), Franciscus Henri and his younger sister Maria T (born 28 June 1950). Henri finished his education in Australia and became a qualified secondary arts and craft teacher. In October 1969, Henri performed at the 1st Annual Festival of Gospel Music with Faye Meadows, David Meadows, Leonie Hawthorn and 3-in-1 Gospel Jazz Trio.

In 1970 he gained national prominence when he competed as a folk musician on a TV talent quest, New Faces, which led to a recording contract with the Melbourne-based independent label Fable Records – label boss, Ron Tudor, was a judge on New Faces. In September 1970 Henri's debut single, "Mary and Me" was issued by Fable and he recorded further singles and an LP, Ding Dong Who Rang the Bell (1972). His second album, Gabriel's Mother's Highway (1972) is described as "a refreshing folk album ... a slightly religious but innocent era".

In 1972 Henri toured with English poet Sydney Carter, and in 1973 he left teaching to join the Monash University Theatre company as a set designer, actor and musician. He participated in the Alexander Theatre productions of Puckoon, Under Milkwood (both 1974), Laertes (1970s) and Giant John (1975). In 1976 he toured throughout Australia and New Zealand supporting the English-Irish comedian Spike Milligan. Henri formed a production company in that year, and began producing performances throughout Australia in conjunction with state arts councils.

From 1979 to October 1980, Henri was a member of the original cast of Shirl's Neighbourhood, a children's television show, presenting his own segments as himself and, as an early alter-ego, Professor Henri.

By 1982, Henri was married.

It was around this time that Henri started to perform children's concerts.

Henri also wrote and presented a series of programs and adds for the Victorian Christian Television Association.
He also appeared on the Q7 program filmed in London, England.

In 1997 he started performing to children as his new character, MISTER WHISKERS, and released his first album under his new moniker, Hello Mister Whiskers, which was nominated for the Best Children's Album Aria Award.

He has performed across the globe, including festivals such as: the Vancouver International Children's Festival and Port Fairy Folk Festival (seven times); and (as MISTER WHISKERS) is the only performer to have played at every Warrnambool Fun 4 Kids Festival since its inception 1998. He has also performed in Singapore a number of times with the Singapore Symphony Orchestra.

From 1989 to 2002 he was a recording artist for ABC Music (ABC for kids), as well as a creator and producer of cover designs, for his own and other releases.

He is the writer of the popular song 'Ducks Like Rain' a cover version recorded by Canadian
entertainer Raffi

His most recent work is Nothing Fixed or Final, the words and music of Sydney Carter, as performed by Henri. He has presented it throughout Victoria and recently in Boston US. In London UK. he performed in the Sydney Carter memorial concert(Oct 2007)

He has so far received seven ARIA award nominations for his various recording work.

Franciscus is also an exhibiting painter.

Discography

 1972 Ding Dong Who Rang the Bell
 1972 Gabriel's Mother's Highway
 1975 Pigtails
 1976 Lord of the Dance
 1981 Sunshine Rainbows and Violins
 1981 Children's Christmas Songs
 1985 Fifty Golden Nursery Rhymes
 1988 Tree House

Releases on CD

Videos/DVDs
OH NO! It's The Franciscus Henri Video (1992)
I'm Hans Christian Andersen (1994)
Hello MISTER WHISKERS! (1998)
My Favourite Nursery Rhymes (2000)
Sing a Song in Singapore

References

External links
 
 Franciscus Henri portraits at Picture Australia, National Library of Australia.
  with Lyn Gallacher on ABC Radio National on 30 April 2005 regarding Nothing Fixed or Final. Archived from the original on 23 March 2010.

1947 births
Living people
Australian children's musicians
Australian folk musicians
Dutch emigrants to Australia
Australian guitarists
Musicians from Melbourne
Australian record producers
Australian singer-songwriters
Naturalised citizens of Australia
Australian Christians
Australian folk singers
Australian pop singers
Acoustic guitarists
Australian male guitarists
Australian male singer-songwriters